Edwardsia is a genus of sea anemones, the type of the family Edwardsiidae. They have eight mesenteries and live in tubes in the sand. The name, in New Latin, commemorates the French zoologist Henri Milne-Edwards.

The genus contains the following species:

Edwardsia allmani McIntosh, 1866
Edwardsia alternobomen Izumi & Fujita, 2019
Edwardsia andresi Danielssen, 1890
Edwardsia annamensis Carlgren, 1943
Edwardsia arctica Carlgren, 1921
Edwardsia arenosa Klunzinger, 1877
Edwardsia athalyei England, 1990
Edwardsia beautempsii Quatrefages, 1842
Edwardsia californica (McMurrich, 1913)
Edwardsia capensis Carlgren, 1938
Edwardsia carlgreni Carlgren, 1921
Edwardsia claparedii (Panceri, 1869)
Edwardsia clavata (Rathke, 1843)
Edwardsia collaris Stimpson, 1856
Edwardsia coriacea Moseley, 1877
Edwardsia costata Danielssen, 1890
Edwardsia danica Carlgren, 1921
Edwardsia delapiae Carlgren & Stephenson, 1928
Edwardsia duodecemtentaculata Carlgren, 1931
Edwardsia elegans Verrill, 1869
Edwardsia finmarchica Carlgren, 1921
Edwardsia flaccida Marion, 1882
Edwardsia fusca Danielssen, 1890
Edwardsia goodsiri M'Intosh, 1866
Edwardsia handi Daly & Ljubenkov, 2008
Edwardsia inachi Sanamyan, Sanamyan & Schories, 2015
Edwardsia incerta Carlgren, 1921
Edwardsia isimangaliso Daly et al., 2012
Edwardsia islandica Carlgren, 1921
Edwardsia ivelli Manuel, 1975
Edwardsia japonica Carlgren, 1931
Edwardsia jonesii Seshaiya & Cuttress, 1969
Edwardsia juliae Daly & Ljubenkov, 2008
Edwardsia kameruniensis Carlgren, 1927
Edwardsia longicornis Carlgren, 1921
Edwardsia mammillata Bourne, 1916
Edwardsia maroccana Carlgren, 1931
Edwardsia mcmurrichi Daly & Ljubenkov, 2008
Edwardsia meridionalis Williams, 1981
Edwardsia migottoi Gusmão, Brandão & Daly, 2016
Edwardsia neozelanica Farquhar, 1898
Edwardsia norvegica Carlgren, 1942
Edwardsia novazelanica Farquhar, 1898
Edwardsia octoplax (Sluiter, 1888)
Edwardsia octoradiata Carlgren, 1931
Edwardsia olguini Daly & Ljubenkov, 2008
Edwardsia perdita Williams, 1981
Edwardsia profunda Daly & Ljubenkov, 2008
Edwardsia rigida Marion, 1882
Edwardsia rubricollum Stimpson, 1856
Edwardsia rugosa Bourne, 1916
Edwardsia sanctaehelenae Carlgren, 1941
Edwardsia scabra Marion, 1882
Edwardsia sipunculoides (Stimpson, 1853)
Edwardsia sojabio Sanamyan N. & Sanamyan K., 2013
Edwardsia sulcata Verrill, 1864
Edwardsia tecta Haddon, 1889
Edwardsia timida Quatrefages, 1842
Edwardsia tinctrix Annandale, 1915
Edwardsia tuberculata Duben & Koren, 1847
Edwardsia vegae Carlgren, 1921
Edwardsia vitrea (Danielssen, 1890)
Edwardsia vivipara Carlgren, 1950
Edwardsia willeyana Bourne, 1916

References

 
Edwardsiidae
Hexacorallia genera
Taxa named by Jean Louis Armand de Quatrefages de Bréau
Taxonomy articles created by Polbot